The 4th arrondissement of Marseille is one of the 16 arrondissements of Marseille. It is governed locally together with the 5th arrondissement, with which it forms the 3rd sector of Marseille.

Population

References

External links
 Official website
 Dossier complet, INSEE

 
04